Entertainment Experience was a Dutch TV-program and competition following the creation of a user-generated film-project in which two films were created: one film made by professionals named Tricked (Steekspel), directed by Dutch director Paul Verhoeven, and one "user-generated film" made by contesting teams of participants. The process of making the films was shown on Veronica.

Production
The project was launched on September 21, 2011, and finished at the end of 2012.

The film script consisted of eight parts. Part one was written by Kim van Kooten. "The crowd" (participators of the competition) wrote the scripts for the seven following parts. Each of the participating film crews made a single short film, corresponding to their part of the film, while Verhoeven filmed all the scripts for his version.

Paul Verhoeven announced the name of his movie on 7 May 2012 on the television show De Wereld Draait Door. The international title of the movie is Tricked. (The Dutch title is Steekspel). It was suggested by the participant Trudi van der Stelt AKA 'Trudiola'.

On 24 September 2012, the movie premiered in the Tuschinski Theater in Amsterdam. Both the version by Verhoeven and the version of the participating teams were shown. On 28 March 2013, Tricked had its public release in EYE.

In March 2013, Lotgenoten (Counterparts), the user-generated version of the winning participants IO Filmproducties, was picked up by Benelux Film Distributors for nationwide theatrical release and on dvd and video on demand.

In 2014 the China edition of the project was launched (the local name is: 全民电影EEC). In China director John Woo and actress Zhang Ziyi were attached.

In 2019 the concept was launched in the Middle East  in close collaboration with Shams Media City. The project was spearheaded by female director Nahla Al Fahad.

Cast (Verhoeven's version)

Progress of the project
The public film was composed out of 8 separate parts. The course of the story was determined by the audience. From the beginning of the project several production teams were formed. They filmed their version of the script. The community exclusively received parts of the final script, put together by scriptwriter Robert Alberdingk Thijm and Paul Verhoeven, in order to film them.

The crews who won a segment:

Composers who wrote a winning score:
Part 1: Roy van der Hoeven
Part 2: Guy Renardeau
Part 3: TTM Productions
Part 4: Augmented Four
Part 5: Luuk Degen
Part 6: Meriam Stokman
Part 7: Luuk Degen
Part 8: Ruud Hermans

The script
Seven of the eight scripts are based on various separate scripts, contributed by the audience. Based on these contributions, Paul Verhoeven and Robert Alberdingk Thijm composed a script each time, which formed the basis for the next script. In total 85 participants contributed to the final scripts. Several recurring contributors are mentioned below.

The teams could write their own ending. The winning screenplay was written by Stephan Brenninkmeijer and Fleur Jansen.

Soundtrack
On May 24, 2012, the winner of the soundtrack competition was chosen. Dutch band Reveller was the winner with a song called "Hold the Horses".
Reveller consist of:

Nominations and wins
March 2012, Entertainment Experience was nominated for a Spin Award in the category Cross Media.
In 2012 Entertainment Experience won the One Show Entertainment Merit Award in the Innovation in Branded Content category
Tricked (Steekspel) was selected for the 7th Rome Film Festival in the category: Medium-length films
In April 2013 Entertainment Experience won an International Digital Emmy Award in the Digital Program Non Fiction category
In 2014 the Chinese edition of the Entertainment Experience was awarded with the Hurun Award
In 2019 the UAE Entertainment Experience was awarded with the BroadcastPro Award as Trendsetter of the Year

References

External links
Official website

Spin Award
Official Selection Rome Film Festival
Nominees International Digital Emmy Awards

Dutch comedy-drama films
Films directed by Paul Verhoeven